Fra' Roberto Viazzo (born October 29, 1952) is an Italian medical doctor and a member of the Sovereign Council of the Sovereign Military Order of Malta.

Career

Viazzo is the head of the Anesthesia, Resuscitation, and Pain Therapy Section at the Azienda Sanitaria Locale di Vercelli.  He is President of the Rotary Club Valsesia.
From 2 June 2022 it is official of merit of the Italian Republic.

Order of Malta

On January 12, 2017, Viazzo made his solemn vows as a Knight of Justice in the Sovereign Military Order of Malta at the Santuario Diocesano Madonna degli Infermi in Vercelli.

Viazzo was elected to a five-year term as a member of the Sovereign Council in May 2019.  He is also a member of the Chapter of the Grand Priory of Rome and a member of the Council of the Order's Italian Association.

Notes

1952 births
People from Vercelli
Italian Roman Catholics
Italian anesthesiologists
Knights of Malta
Living people